Cydia walsinghamii is a moth of the family Tortricidae. It was first described by Arthur Gardiner Butler in 1882. It is endemic to the Hawaiian islands of Kauai, Oahu, Maui and Hawaii.

It has very variable wing patterns.

The larvae feed on the seeds and twigs of Acacia koa and Acacia koaia. They live in dead twigs and also bore into tips of living twigs.

External links

Species info

Grapholitini
Endemic moths of Hawaii